Ads Infinitum was a British television comedy sketch/archive series, co-written and presented by Victor Lewis-Smith that originally ran on BBC Two, beginning with a 10-minute pilot episode in December 1996 that focused on adverts for Christmas toys, two series would soon follow. A series of 6 episodes in 1998, and a second series of 8 episodes in 2000. The series would look at old TV and cinema adverts, some footage previously unseen on UK TV, which Lewis-Smith would usually make fun of.

Episodes

See also

 TV Offal
 1998 in British television
 2000 in British television

External links

1996 British television series debuts
2000 British television series endings
1990s British comedy television series
2000s British comedy television series
BBC Television shows
English-language television shows